Sugamana Raagangal is a 1985 Indian Tamil-language film written and directed by R. Sundarrajan. The film stars Sivakumar, Saritha, Jeevitha and Rajeev. It was released on 3 May 1985.

Plot

Cast 

Sivakumar
Saritha
Jeevitha
Rajeev
Nizhalgal Ravi
V. Gopalakrishnan
Poornam Viswanathan in Guest Appearance
T. K. S. Chandran
Karikolraj
Pasi Narayanan
V. M. John
Madhan
Kovai I. S. Murugesh (debut)
Ragini (debut)
Ravichandran

Soundtrack 
Soundtrack was composed by M. S. Viswanathan. All lyrics written by Vaali.

Reception
Jayamanmadhan of Kalki wrote first half is sandalwood paste, second half is sewer mud.

References

External links 
 

1980s Tamil-language films
1985 films
Films directed by R. Sundarrajan
Films scored by M. S. Viswanathan